HD 90156 b is an extrasolar planet which orbits the G-type main sequence star HD 90156, located approximately 73 light years away.

References 

Exoplanets discovered in 2009
Exoplanets detected by radial velocity
Giant planets
Hydra (constellation)
Hot Neptunes